The Group of Personal Friends, sometimes referred to by the Spanish acronym GAP, was the informal name of an armed guard of the Socialist Party of Chile maintained from 1970 to 1973 for the protection of Salvador Allende. The GAP was trained and equipped by Cuba and initially composed of ex-guerrilla fighters.

History

Formation
The GAP was formed during Salvador Allende's 1970 presidential campaign by Fernando Gómez, a member of the Cuban-trained Bolivian guerrilla group the ELN, at the instigation of Allende's daughter, Beatriz Allende. By the time of the election, the GAP had expanded with the addition of more ex-ELN combatants volunteering to provide security to Allende and, later, members of the Revolutionary Left Movement (MIR).

Cuba provided technical advisers to assist the GAP, including among them Tony de la Guardia and Patricio de la Guardia.

Presidential protection

On one of Allende's first public appearances after his inauguration, a Chilean journalist inquired of the president who the armed men were accompanying him, to which Allende replied "a group of personal friends", giving the group the moniker from which it would thereafter be known. During the 1971 visit of Fidel Castro to Chile, Cuban protection officers brought with them an unusually large arsenal including RPG-7s and AK-47s, leaving almost the entire quantity behind in Chile for the previously pistol-equipped GAP.

Allende came to rely on the GAP as his principal protective force, despite the organization having no formal legal status. GAP leveraged its hybrid status to conduct recce and intelligence-gathering in Chile under the pretense of presidential protection but with information actually being collected for the benefit of MIR paramilitary operations against the political opposition. However, a 1972 operation in Curimon, in which intoxicated GAP personnel fumbled their mission to locate the whereabouts of Arturo Marshall, made Chilean military intelligence aware of the use of GAP in this manner. This led to the disentanglement of the GAP from MIR, which was put under the formal control of the ruling Socialist Party, leading to the resignation or dismissal of many of the MIR members of the GAP.

Defense of La Moneda
At the outset of the 1973 Chilean coup d'état, the presidential palace of La Moneda was defended by members of the GAP, 20 detectives of the Investigations Police of Chile (PDI), and 300 carabineros. As news of the military uprising reached Santiago, leader Bruno the White led a dozen armed GAP reinforcements to the presidential residence. However, on approaching the PDI detectives stationed at the palace to rally their assistance, the group was promptly disarmed and arrested. At 9:00 a.m. on September 11, the carabineros withdrew after Gen. César Mendoza, commandant of the Carabineros de Chile, threw the force's support to the military junta. 

The main attack against the presidential palace commenced shortly after the carabineros had withdrawn. At about 1:30 p.m. on September 11, Chilean Army infantry entered the building; following an exchange of gunfire, GAP personnel surrendered and Allende committed suicide. Nearly 30 GAP personnel either died during the fighting, or were executed after the fall of the palace.

Organization
The GAP was organized into three elements: Escort, Advance, and Garrison.

The Escort group provided close protection to Allende and was composed of approximately 20 men. The Escort group operated blue Fiat sedans; presidential motorcades would generally consist of three Escort group Fiats - one of which, bearing the license plate number "1", carried Allende - accompanied by police vehicles.

The Advance group, led by Francisco Argandoña (nom de guerre "Mariano"), had the fewest personnel and was responsible for scouting locations to be visited by Allende prior to his arrival.

The Garrison group was divided into three six-man sections, one assigned to each of the three presidential residences and responsible for static security at those locations in concert with police guards.

Relationship with the police and military
The relationship between the GAP and the police and military was generally strained. During the failed Tanquetazo coup attempt of June 1973, as reinforced GAP elements hurried Allende to La Moneda, they encountered  a patrol of Chilean Army soldiers en route. Though the troops were loyalists, GAP personnel held them at gunpoint until the president's motorcade had passed as a precaution. However, Unidad Popular supporters within the security forces had a more cooperative relationship with the GAP. Gen. Carlos Prats requested the GAP provide for his security, in addition to that of Allende, due to deepening distrust Prats had in his own subordinates. And, during the Tanquetazo, after Allende instructed his GAP protectors not to accompany him into PDI headquarters, Allende's naval attache - Capt. Arturo Arata - countermanded Allende's orders and took personal command of the GAP Escort group, telling them to "get their guns out and protect" Allende.

Recruitment and training 

GAP personnel were recruited from among current Socialist Party of Chile members who were recommended by party functionaries and met physical requirements. Selected members underwent a 15-day weapons and security training course in Cuba.

GAP's capabilities were dismissed by Chilean Navy commander José Toribio Merino who wrote in his memoirs of a visit he made to Allende six days before the coup and recalled that "we found ourselves facing a fort, Disney movie style, an armed protected fortress ... a laughable show. What they were doing they took seriously ... They seemed like kids playing bandits".

References

External links
Colorized photograph of Allende with GAP personnel during the defense of La Moneda
1970 establishments in Chile
1973 disestablishments in Chile
Presidency of Salvador Allende
Socialist Party of Chile